51st New York Film Critics Circle Awards
January 26, 1986

Best Picture: 
 Prizzi's Honor 
The 51st New York Film Critics Circle Awards honored the best filmmaking of 1985. The winners were announced on December 18, 1985, and the awards were given on January 26, 1986.

Winners
Best Actor:
Jack Nicholson - Prizzi's Honor
Runner-up: William Hurt - Kiss of the Spider Woman
Best Actress:
Norma Aleandro - The Official Story (La historia oficial)
Runners-up: Meryl Streep - Out of Africa and Geraldine Page - The Trip to Bountiful
Best Cinematography:
David Watkin - Out of Africa
Best Director:
John Huston - Prizzi's Honor
Runner-up: Akira Kurosawa - Ran
Best Documentary:
Shoah
Best Film:
Prizzi's Honor
Runner-up: The Purple Rose of Cairo, Out of Africa and Brazil
Best Foreign Language Film:
Ran • Japan/France
Best Screenplay:
Woody Allen - The Purple Rose of Cairo
Runner-up: Albert Brooks and Monica Johnson - Lost in America
Best Supporting Actor:
Klaus Maria Brandauer - Out of Africa
Runner-up: John Gielgud - Plenty
Best Supporting Actress:
Anjelica Huston - Prizzi's Honor

References

External links
1985 Awards

1985
New York Film Critics Circle Awards, 1985
New York Film Critics Circle Awards
New York Film Critics Circle Awards
New York Film Critics Circle Awards
New York Film Critics Circle Awards